The Grand Prix de la ville de Nogent-sur-Oise is a road bicycle race held annually in France. It was organized as a 1.2 event on the UCI Europe Tour from 2005 to 2013, and again in 2015. The race was reserved for amateurs in 2014 and 2016.

Winners

References

UCI Europe Tour races
Cycle races in France
1945 establishments in France
Recurring sporting events established in 1945